Levesque or Lévesque is a surname of French origin, equivalent to English Bishop, and may refer to:

Alice Lemieux-Lévesque (1905–1983), Canadian-American writer
Alexandra Sicotte-Levesque, Canadian journalist and human rights activist
Andrée Lévesque (born 1939), Canadian historian
Annie Levesque (born 1979), Canadian volleyball player
Cassandra Levesque (born c. 1999), American politician
Chris Levesque (born 1980), Canadian ice hockey player
Christian Lévesque (born 1970), Canadian politician
Elyse Levesque (born 1985), Canadian film and television actress
Emilien Levesque (1922–2003), American politician
Emily Levesque (born 1984), American astrophysicist
François Lévesque (1732–1787), French-born Canadian merchant and politician
François Lévesque (lawyer) (1772–1823), Canadian lawyer and politician
Georges-Henri Lévesque (1903–2000), Canadian Dominican priest and sociologist
Gérard D. Levesque (1926–1993), Canadian politician
Hector Levesque (born 1951), Canadian academic and AI researcher
J. Adrien Lévesque (1923–1995), Canadian politician
James Levesque (1962–2014), American punk-rock musician
Jean-François Lévesque, Canadian animator
Jean-Louis Lévesque (1911–1994), Canadian entrepreneur, racehorse owner, and philanthropist
Joanna Levesque (born 1990), American singer and songwriter known as JoJo
Joseph L. Levesque (born c. 1940), American Catholic priest and educator
Laurent Levesque (born 1970), French film composer
Laurier Lévesque (1929–2005), Canadian politician
Léo Lévesque, Canadian poet and writer
Léonard Lévesque (1935–2017), Canadian politician
Louise Levesque (1703–1745), French author
Marcel Lévesque (1877–1962), French actor
Marie-Christine Lévesque (1958–2020), Canadian author
Marylise Lévesque (born 1983), Canadian judoka
Mathieu Lévesque, Canadian politician
Melanie Levesque (born 1957), American politician
Moe Levesque (born 1937/1938), Canadian football player
Nicole Levesque (born 1972), American basketball player
Paul Levesque (born 1969), American wrestler and actor
Stephanie McMahon Levesque (born 1976), American wrestler and businesswoman
Sylvain Lévesque (born 1973), Canadian politician
Raymond Lévesque (1928–2021), Canadian singer-songwriter and poet
René Lévesque (1922–1987), Canadian politician, 23rd Premier of Quebec
Roger Levesque (born 1981), American soccer player
Roger J.R. Levesque (born 1963), American criminologist
Valerie Levesque (born 1974), American reporter
Yves Lévesque (born 1957), Canadian politician
Yvon Lévesque (born 1940), Canadian politician

See also
 Leveque

Occupational surnames
Surnames of Norman origin
French-language surnames